Secret & Lies is the debut extended play (EP) by Japanese pop band U-ka Saegusa in dB, released on 5 February 2003 by Giza Studio. The album peaked at number twenty on the Oricon weekly albums chart and has sold over 30,111 copies nationwide.

Singles
"Whenever I Think of You" was released on 12 June 2002 as the lead single. The single reached number forty-one in Japan and has sold over 6,580 copies nationwide. The song served as the theme songs to the Japanese anime television series, Cheeky Angel. "Whenever I Think of You" was covered and recorded by the song's writer, Akihito Tokunaga for his first studio album, Route 109 (2020).

Track listing

Charts

Weekly charts

References

2003 EPs
Giza Studio albums
U-ka Saegusa in dB albums